Penybont United Football Club is a Welsh football team based in Penybont, Ceredigion, Wales.  The team currently play in the Central Wales League Southern Division, which is at the fourth tier of the Welsh football league system.

Honours
Mid Wales South League
Champions: 1953–54, 1954–55, 1955–56, 1956–57, 1969–70, 1992–93, 1994–95
Runners-up: 1962–63, 1968–69, 1972–73, 1993–94, 2012–13
Mid Wales (South) League Cup – Winners: 1973–74, 1992–93, 2018–19
Emrys Morgan Cup – Winners: 2011–12

References

Mid Wales Football League clubs
Football clubs in Wales
Sport in Ceredigion
Mid Wales South League clubs